Biotechnology and Applied Biochemistry is a bimonthly peer-reviewed scientific journal covering biotechnology applied to medicine, veterinary medicine, and diagnostics. Topics covered include the expression, extraction, purification, formulation, stability and characterization of both natural and recombinant biological molecules. It is published by Wiley-Blackwell on behalf of the International Union of Biochemistry and Molecular Biology. The editors-in-chief are Gianfranco Gilardi (University of Torino) and Jian-Jiang Zhong (Shanghai Jiao Tong University).

History
The journal was established in 1979 under the title Journal of Applied Biochemistry by Academic Press, obtaining its present title in 1986.

Former editors-in-chief include Peter Campbell (University College London; before 1996), Roger Lundblad (formerly of Baxter Biotech, Duarte, California; 1996–2002), and Parviz A. Shamlou (Eli Lilly; 2003–2012).

Abstracting and indexing
The journal is abstracted and indexed by:

According to the Journal Citation Reports, the journal has a 2019 impact factor of 1.638.

References

External links
 

Publications established in 1979
Biochemistry journals
Biotechnology journals
English-language journals
Wiley-Blackwell academic journals
Bimonthly journals